Richard "King Richard", "Kermit" Brodeur (born September 15, 1952), is a Canadian former professional ice hockey goaltender. Brodeur was born in Longueuil, Quebec and grew up in Montreal, Quebec.

Playing career
Brodeur was selected in the 1972 NHL Entry Draft by the New York Islanders, but chose instead to play in the World Hockey Association with the Quebec Nordiques, for whom he played for seven seasons.  The 1975–76 season was his best; he played 69 games and won 44 of them.  In 1976–77, he helped his team win the Avco World Trophy.

When the WHA folded following the 1978–79 season, he was protected as one of the Nordiques' priority selections, then was traded to the Islanders for Göran Högosta.  However, he only played two games for them as he was the third goalie behind Billy Smith and Chico Resch, and was traded to the Vancouver Canucks in 1980.  In his second season with the Canucks, he guided the team during their playoff run to the finals, which they lost to Brodeur's old team, the Islanders.

Brodeur was selected to play in the 1983 All-Star Game, but couldn't play due to an ear injury suffered in Toronto three days earlier.  He remained with the Canucks for almost eight seasons, then was traded near the end of the 1987–88 NHL season to the Hartford Whalers, where he ended his NHL career.  He was the last active NHL player from the WHA's inaugural season, and the last to have played in all seven seasons of the WHA's existence.

After his retirement, he founded his own hockey school in the Vancouver area.  He also briefly worked as an analyst on Quebec Nordiques French TV telecasts.

He has been noted as the goaltender on whom Wayne Gretzky scored the most goals, with 29.

Awards
Terry Sawchuk Award (CHL) - 1979-1980
Named to the NHL All-Star Game - 1983
Cyclone Taylor Award (Vancouver Canucks) - 1981, 1982, 1985
Molson Cup (Most Canucks three-star selections) - 1980–81, 1981–82, 1984–85, 1985–86
Inaugural inductee into the World Hockey Association Hall of Fame - 2010

Personal life
Brodeur is an artist, using oil on canvas, and has had several shows at Diskin Galleries in Vancouver.

Career statistics

References

External links

Profile at hockeydraftcentral.com
King Richard Brodeur's Hockey School

1952 births
Living people
Binghamton Whalers players
Canadian ice hockey goaltenders
Cornwall Royals (QMJHL) players
Fredericton Express players
French Quebecers
Hartford Whalers players
Ice hockey people from Montreal
Indianapolis Checkers (CHL) players
Maine Nordiques players
New York Islanders draft picks
New York Islanders players
Sportspeople from Longueuil
Quebec Nordiques (WHA) players
Vancouver Canucks players
Verdun Maple Leafs (ice hockey) players